Hiram Walbridge (February 2, 1821 – December 6, 1870) was a U.S. Representative from New York, cousin of Henry Sanford Walbridge.

Life and career

Walbridge was born in Ithaca, New York on February 2, 1821, a son of Chester and Mary Walbridge. He was educated in Ithaca and Utica, and privately tutored by an uncle. He moved to Ohio with his parents, who settled in Toledo in 1836. He attended the University of Ohio in Athens from 1839 to 1840, but was expelled for violating the school's rule against partisan political activities after he campaigned for William Henry Harrison in the 1840 United States presidential election.

Walbridge studied law with Judge Myron H. Tilden of Toledo, was admitted to the bar in 1842 and commenced practice in Toledo. He was also an active member of the state militia, and was commissioned a brigadier general in 1843. He served as a member of Toledo's board of aldermen from 1843 to 1846. He later moved to Buffalo, New York, where he engaged in the mercantile business. He moved to New York City in 1847, where he continued his mercantile career.

Walbridge was elected as a Democrat to the Thirty-third Congress (March 4, 1853 – March 3, 1855). He declined to be a candidate for renomination in 1854. He supported the Union during the American Civil War and in 1862 was an unsuccessful Union candidate for election to the Thirty-eighth Congress.

He served as president of the International Commercial Convention held in Detroit, Michigan, July 11, 1865. Walbridge was elected as a delegate to the 1866 National Union Convention in Philadelphia.

He died in New York City December 6, 1870. He was interred in Glenwood Cemetery in Washington, D.C.

References

Bibliography

External links

1821 births
1870 deaths
American militia generals
Burials at Glenwood Cemetery (Washington, D.C.)
New York (state) Unionists
Democratic Party members of the United States House of Representatives from New York (state)
19th-century American politicians
Politicians from Ithaca, New York